"Stop That Train" may refer to:

"Stop That Train (The Spanishtonians song)", a 1965 ska single, later covered by other artists
"Stop That Train", a section of the 1989 Beastie Boys song "B-Boy Bouillabaisse" that samples the Keith & Tex version
"Stop That Train", a 1991 single by Vanilla Ice that samples the Keith & Tex version
"Stop That Train", a 1970 song by Peter Tosh, recorded with the Wailers on The Best of the Wailers (1971) and Catch a Fire (1973), and by Tosh again on Mama Africa (1983)